Observatory Circle is a street in Washington, D.C. It runs from Calvert Street to Massachusetts Avenue near 34th Street. Established in 1894, the street follows an incomplete loop, forming an arc rather than a circle. Number One Observatory Circle is the official residence of the Vice President of the United States.

The inside of the arc formed by Observatory was blurred on Google Maps.

See also
List of circles in Washington, D.C.
Observatory Circle, Washington, D.C. - article about the neighborhood
United States Naval Observatory

References

Streets in Washington, D.C.
Squares, plazas, and circles in Washington, D.C.
Embassy Row